AZAL Arena is a football stadium in Shuvelan settlement of Baku, Azerbaijan.  It was the home stadium of Shuvalan FK.  The stadium holds 3,500 people and opened in 2011.

Background 
The first game ever played at AZAL Arena was AZAL PFC - FK Baku (1:0), April 10, 2011. Belarusian striker Gennady Bliznyuk scored a first goal at the stadium. 

On 17 February 2011, UEFA approved this stadium to be used for international football matches and gave 2 stars for stadium category.

Future
The club plans to construct another tribune and increase the capacity to 6000 in the coming years.

Events 
The stadium was used as a training ground during 2012 FIFA U-17 Women's World Cup.

See also
List of football stadiums in Azerbaijan

References

External links

Shuvalan FK
Football venues in Baku
Sports venues completed in 2011